Geshi may refer to:
 Xiazhi, a term relating to East Asian calendars
 Geshi, Iran (disambiguation), places in Iran
 GeSHi Generic Syntax Highlighter, a software library that allows syntax highlighting of source code